The Banu Yashkur is an Arab tribe belonging to the larger Banu Bakr ibn Wa'il tribe. The tribe is originally from Al-Yamama and had control over this region in the pre-Islamic period.

Ancestry 
The tribe descended from Yashkur ibn Bakr ibn Wa'il ibn Qasit ibn Hanab ibn Afsa ibn Da'mi ibn Jadila ibn Asad ibn Rabi'a ibn Nizar ibn Ma'ad ibn Adnan.

History 
Banu Yashkur practiced farming in al-Yamama. The tribe is said to have been of great power a few generations before the birth of Islam. Being the most dominant tribe among the Rabi'ah tribes, and was led by a man named al-Harith ibn 'Anaz ibn Ghanem. After Islam, the tribe became less prominent. Banu Yashkur participated in many battles and events, most notably the Battle of Siffin.

Notable members 

 Al-Harith ibn Hilliza al-Yashkuri, author of one of the seven famous pre-Islamic poems known as the Mu'allaqat.
Al-Munakhal al-Yashkuri, pre-Islamic poet and sailor.

Sources 

 Donner, F. M. The Bakr B. Wā'il Tribes and Politics in Northeastern Arabia on the Eve of Islam Brill.
 Ibn Hazm. Jamharat Ansab al-'Arab (in Arabic)

Tribes of Arabia
Tribes of Saudi Arabia
Rabi`ah